Kai Rapsch (born in 1978) is a German oboist, cor anglais player and entrepreneur.

Life 
At the age of 15 he entered the Julius-Stern Institute of the Berlin University of the Arts. From 1997 he studied in the oboe class of Burkhard Glaetzner. From 2000 to 2004 he studied with Günther Passin at the University of Music and Performing Arts Munich.

During his studies he was a member of the Mozarteum Orchestra Salzburg. Since 2004 he has been principal English horn and oboist with the Munich Philharmonic. He is also a lecturer at the Orchestra Academy there.

Recitals, chamber concerts and master classes have taken him to music festivals in Dresden, Salzburg and Mecklenburg-Vorpommern as well as to Japan and South Korea. As a soloist he has performed with the Mozarteum Orchestra Salzburg, the Chamber Ensemble Salzburg Orchestra Soloists, the Bach Collegium Munich and the Neues Bachisches Collegium Musicum in Leipzig.

In 2012 he founded the company Reeds for Oboes, with which he distributes handmade reeds for English Horn, oboe d'amore and oboes worldwide.

Awards 
In 1994/95 Rapsch was a music scholar of the Jürgen Ponto-Stiftung zur Förderung junger Künstler He has repeatedly been awarded at the federal competition Jugend musiziert. In 1999 he was a prizewinner at the international competition of the Konzertgesellschaft München.

Discography 
 Various: LeiseLaute (Cybele Records/, 1997)
 Dieter Schleip: "Komponiert in Deutschland 07" (Edition Filmmusik, 2008)

References

External links 
 
 Website von Kai Rapsch
 Website von Reeds for Oboes
 Kai Rapsch at the Münchner Philharmonikern
 

Cor anglais players
Classical oboists
21st-century German businesspeople
1978 births
Living people
Musicians from Berlin